Maria Leissner (born ) is a Swedish politician and former party leader of the Swedish Liberal People's Party (1995–97). Between 2000 and 2004 she was Sweden's ambassador to Guatemala. In January 2007 she was appointed Ambassador-at-large for Democracy. In April 2012 she was appointed Secretary-General of Community of Democracies.

Bibliography
 En generösare invandrar- och flyktingpolitik (1988)
 Democracy promotion in a transatlantic perspective (2009)

References

External links

The Swedish Parliament: Maria Leissner (FP)

1956 births
Living people
People from Gothenburg
Liberals (Sweden) politicians
Leaders of political parties in Sweden
Women members of the Riksdag
Members of the Riksdag
Ambassadors of Sweden to Guatemala
20th-century Swedish women politicians
20th-century Swedish politicians
Swedish women ambassadors